Anthology 2 is a compilation album by the Beatles, released on 18 March 1996 by Apple Records as part of The Beatles Anthology series. It features rarities, outtakes and live performances from the 1965 sessions for Help! to the sessions just prior to their trip to India in February 1968. It is the second in a trilogy of albums with Anthology 1 and Anthology 3, all of which tie in with the televised special The Beatles Anthology. The opening track is "Real Love", the second of the two recordings that reunited the Beatles for the first time since the band's break-up. Like its predecessor, the album topped the Billboard 200 album chart and has been certified 4× Platinum by the RIAA.

The Anthology albums were remastered and made available digitally on the iTunes Store on 14 June 2011, individually and as part of the Anthology Box Set.

Content
"Real Love", as with "Free as a Bird", is based on a demo made by John Lennon and given to Paul McCartney by Lennon's widow, Yoko Ono. The three surviving Beatles (McCartney, George Harrison and Ringo Starr) added guitars, bass, drums, percussion and backing vocals, but unlike with the previous song, did not re-work the lyrics or music. "Real Love" remained solely credited to Lennon, becoming the only Beatles song to have Lennon by himself in the writing credit.

Disc one contains three unreleased compositions, one being an instrumental entitled "12-Bar Original", recorded for Rubber Soul but subsequently unused. Two other songs recorded for Help!, "If You've Got Trouble" and "That Means a Lot", were abandoned and never returned to again by the band. The former was originally slated to be the usual vocal spot for Ringo Starr on Help!, and the latter was eventually given to singer P.J. Proby. The version of "Everybody's Trying to Be My Baby" from the group's famed August 1965 show at Shea Stadium but left out of the documentary about the show appears for the first time.

"I'm Down" was originally listed as Track 7 (in its correct place chronologically) but was shifted out of sequence to Track 3 at the last minute, at Paul McCartney's request. The album had already gone to press and McCartney reportedly paid the re-printing costs himself.

Disc two contains work-in-progress versions of tracks from Sgt. Pepper's Lonely Hearts Club Band and Magical Mystery Tour. The take of "Strawberry Fields Forever" that made up the first minute of the released record appears in its entirety on track three. Also included are three songs that were started during this period – "Only a Northern Song", "You Know My Name (Look Up the Number)" and "Across the Universe" – but would not see release until years later, in 1969 and 1970.

McCartney had hoped to include "Carnival of Light", an unreleased experimental piece that the Beatles recorded during the sessions for Sgt. Pepper in 1967; however, the idea was vetoed by Harrison, Starr and Ono on the grounds that the track was never intended for a Beatles release. Among the songs that were in the running for inclusion on the compilation but ultimately passed over were the following: the 1965 Shea Stadium performance of "She's a Woman"; a live version of "Nowhere Man", recorded in Tokyo in 1966; "Paperback Writer", featuring only vocals; and out-takes of "Think for Yourself" and "Love You To".

Reception

Like its predecessor, Anthology 2 sold well. In the United States, it debuted at number one, selling 442,000 copies its first week. The next week, it fell to number two, selling 201,000 copies, being replaced by Alanis Morissette's Jagged Little Pill. The album spent two more weeks on the top 10, at number four then number eight, remaining on the Billboard 200 for 22 consecutive weeks and then re-entering the charts twice, marking a number 96 reach during the Christmas season of 1996. In all, the album spent 37 weeks on the charts (eight more than Anthology 1) and sold 1,707,000 copies. In the United Kingdom, the success was similar. The first Anthology album had debuted at number two when it was released in November 1995, but its successor reached number one, where it remained for one week. The album spent a total of 13 weeks on the UK Albums Chart.

Reviewing the compilation in March 1996, Billboards reviewer described it as a "precious window into the most lucrative creative collaboration in the history of popular music".

Release history

Track listing

CD release
All tracks in stereo, except where noted.

Vinyl release

Side one
"Real Love"
"Yes It Is"
"I'm Down"
"You've Got to Hide Your Love Away"
"If You've Got Trouble"
"That Means a Lot"
"Yesterday"
"It's Only Love"

Side two
"I Feel Fine"
"Ticket to Ride"
"Yesterday"
"Help!"
"Everybody's Trying to Be My Baby"
"Norwegian Wood (This Bird Has Flown)"
"I'm Looking Through You"
"12-Bar Original"

Side three
"Tomorrow Never Knows"
"Got to Get You into My Life"
"And Your Bird Can Sing"
"Taxman"
"Eleanor Rigby" (strings only)
"I'm Only Sleeping" (rehearsal)
"I'm Only Sleeping" (Take 1)
"Rock and Roll Music"
"She's a Woman"

Side four
"Strawberry Fields Forever" (demo sequence)
"Strawberry Fields Forever" (Take 1)
"Strawberry Fields Forever" (Take 7 and edit piece)
"Penny Lane"
"A Day in the Life"
"Good Morning Good Morning"
"Only a Northern Song"

Side five
"Being for the Benefit of Mr. Kite!" (Takes 1 and 2)
"Being for the Benefit of Mr. Kite!" (Take 7)
"Lucy in the Sky with Diamonds"
"Within You Without You" (instrumental)
"Sgt. Pepper's Lonely Hearts Club Band (Reprise)"
"You Know My Name (Look Up the Number)"

Side six
"I Am the Walrus"
"The Fool on the Hill" (demo)
"Your Mother Should Know"
"The Fool on the Hill" (Take 4)
"Hello, Goodbye"
"Lady Madonna"
"Across the Universe"

Cassette release

Side one
"Real Love"
"Yes It Is"
"I'm Down"
"You've Got to Hide Your Love Away"
"If You've Got Trouble"
"That Means a Lot"
"Yesterday"
"It's Only Love"
"I Feel Fine"
"Ticket to Ride"
"Yesterday"
"Help!"

Side two
"Everybody's Trying to Be My Baby"
"Norwegian Wood (This Bird Has Flown)"
"I'm Looking Through You"
"12-Bar Original"
"Tomorrow Never Knows"
"Got to Get You into My Life"
"And Your Bird Can Sing"
"Taxman"
"Eleanor Rigby" (strings only)
"I'm Only Sleeping" (rehearsal)
"I'm Only Sleeping" (Take 1)
"Rock and Roll Music"
"She's a Woman"

Side three
"Strawberry Fields Forever" (demo sequence)
"Strawberry Fields Forever" (Take 1)
"Strawberry Fields Forever" (Take 7 and edit piece)
"Penny Lane"
"A Day in the Life"
"Good Morning Good Morning"
"Only a Northern Song"
"Being for the Benefit of Mr. Kite!" (Takes 1 and 2)
"Being for the Benefit of Mr. Kite!" (Take 7)
"Lucy in the Sky with Diamonds"
"Within You Without You" (instrumental)

Side four
"Sgt. Pepper's Lonely Hearts Club Band (Reprise)"
"You Know My Name (Look Up the Number)"
"I Am the Walrus"
"The Fool on the Hill" (demo)
"Your Mother Should Know"
"The Fool on the Hill" (Take 4)
"Hello, Goodbye"
"Lady Madonna"
"Across the Universe"

Charts

Weekly charts

Year-end charts

Certifications

Notes

1996 compilation albums
Albums produced by George Harrison
Albums produced by George Martin
Albums produced by Jeff Lynne
Albums produced by John Lennon
Albums produced by Paul McCartney
Albums produced by Ringo Starr
Albums with cover art by Klaus Voormann
Apple Records compilation albums
Capitol Records compilation albums
Compilation albums published posthumously
The Beatles Anthology
The Beatles compilation albums
Albums recorded in a home studio